The Credit One Charleston Open, formerly known as the Volvo Car Open and the Family Circle Cup, is a WTA Tour-affiliated professional tennis tournament for women, held every year since 1973. It is the oldest professional all-women's tournament in America with a $888,636 purse. The tournament celebrated 50 years in 2022 at the newly renovated Credit One Stadium located in Charleston, South Carolina.

The tournament is played on the green clay courts at LTP-Daniel Island (which contains the 10,200-seat Credit One Stadium) on Daniel Island in Charleston, South Carolina, USA. From its inception in 1973 to 2000, the tournament was held at the Sea Pines Plantation on Hilton Head Island with the exception of 1975 and 1976 when it was played on Amelia Island off the coast of Florida. The event moved to Charleston, and specifically Daniel Island, in 2001.

From 1973 to 2015, the title sponsor was Family Circle magazine, which had made it the longest-running title sponsor in professional tennis. Volvo Cars took over sponsorship from 2016 to 2021. Credit One Bank became the title sponsor of both the tournament and stadium in July 2021.

From 1990 to 2008, the tournament was classified as a WTA Tier I event. In 2009, it was downgraded to a WTA Premier tournament. It celebrated its 40th year in 2012 by naming its main stadium court in honor of Billie Jean King. With the reorganization of the WTA's schedule in 2021, the tournament became a WTA 500 tournament.

The current champion is Belinda Bencic, who won the singles tournament in April 2022.

Past finals

Singles

Doubles

Exhibition team tournament
Because of an ongoing pandemic, the tournament in 2020 was reformatted into a Laver Cup style team tournament.  Each team captain's name in BOLD and listed first.

References

External links

 Official site
 WTA tournament profile

 
Women's tennis tournaments in the United States
Clay court tennis tournaments
WTA Tour
Sports in Charleston, South Carolina
Recurring sporting events established in 1973
Tennis in South Carolina
Tennis tournaments in South Carolina
Events in Charleston, South Carolina